Roady may refer to:

 Road crew, or roadie
 Dennis Roady (born 1983), U.S. internet personality
 Roady (Mousquetaires), a French shop chain
 Roady's Truck Stops, a U.S. truck stop chain

See also
 Roadie (disambiguation)
 Rodi (disambiguation)
 Rody (disambiguation)
 Rhody (disambiguation)